The Blum–Micali algorithm is a cryptographically secure pseudorandom number generator. The algorithm gets its security from the difficulty of computing discrete logarithms. 

Let  be an odd prime, and let  be a primitive root modulo .  Let  be a seed, and let

.

The th output of the algorithm is 1 if 
.  
Otherwise the output is 0. It has been shown that  bits of  can be used if solving the discrete log problem is infeasible even for exponents with as few as  bits.

In order for this generator to be secure, the prime number  needs to be large enough so that computing discrete logarithms modulo  is infeasible.  To be more precise, any method that predicts the numbers generated will lead to an algorithm that solves the discrete logarithm problem for that prime.

There is a paper discussing possible examples of the quantum permanent compromise attack to the Blum–Micali construction. This attacks illustrate how a previous attack to the Blum–Micali generator can be extended to the whole Blum–Micali construction, including the Blum Blum Shub and Kaliski generators.

References

External links 
 https://web.archive.org/web/20080216164459/http://crypto.stanford.edu/pbc/notes/crypto/blummicali.xhtml

Cryptographically secure pseudorandom number generators